State route 147 (SR-147) is a state highway in the U.S. state of Utah. Spanning , it connects West Mountain and Benjamin in western Utah Valley with Interstate 15 (I-15), Spanish Fork, and Mapleton on the east side of the valley.

Route description
State Route 147 begins west of Payson at McBeth Corner, which is the northern terminus of SR-141 and the intersection of 5600 West and 10400 South. State Route 147 travels north about  before again turning east on 6400 South, just south of Lake Shore. From here, the route continues east, under I-15, through central Spanish Fork as 400 North, across US-89 before finally turning north on Main Street in Mapleton.

History
State Route 147 was established on June 26, 1933 along an alignment similar to the current one, with two key differences. It originally started in Payson, travelling west along Utah Ave/10400 South until turning north at its current starting point at McBeth Corner, and it originally ended on Main Street in Mapleton. In 1935, the state legislature ended SR-147 at US-89 (then known as SR-8) and split off the last stretch of the route between US-89 (then known as SR-8) and Mapleton as State Route 167. This extension was absorbed into SR-147 two years later, in 1941.

SR-147 remained unchanged until 1969, when the section of SR-167 along Maple Street was redesignated as part of SR-147. The section of SR-167 from SR-147 via Main Street to Mapleton was cancelled. The route again remained unchanged until 2000, when the portion of the route from Payson west to McBeth Corner was transferred to Payson City and Utah County in exchange for UDOT designating 800 South in Payson from I-15 east to SR-198 (State Street) as State Route 178.

Major intersections

References

147
 147
Spanish Fork, Utah